Hadi Bahadori (born 1978) is an Iranian politician.  He was born in Urmia, West Azerbaijan province. He is a member of the tenth Islamic Consultative Assembly from the electorate of Urmia, He and Rohollah Hazratpour won in the second round. Hadi Bahadori graduate of Sharif University of Technology and professor of Civil Engineering in University of Urmia. in the past Bahadori was deputy civil affairs Governorship of West Azarbaijan and member of fourth Urmia city council.

Bahordi is head of the Western Azerbaijan Province's Committee for the restoration of Lake Urmia.

References

People from Urmia
Deputies of Urmia
Living people
1978 births
Iranian civil engineers
Members of the 10th Islamic Consultative Assembly
Academic staff of Urmia University
Sharif University of Technology alumni
Moderation and Development Party politicians
Iranian city councillors